Dennis Mast (born 15 February 1992) is a German professional footballer who plays as a left midfielder for Chemie Leipzig.

Career
Mast began his career with Hallescher FC, for whom he signed from Energie Cottbus in 2009, and broke into the first team near the end of the 2010–11 season. The following season, he made 29 appearances as the club won the Regionalliga Nord title, and promotion to the 3. Liga. He made his first appearance at this level on 28 July 2012, in a 0–0 draw away to Karlsruher SC. After a successful 2012–13 season with Halle, he signed for Karlsruhe in July 2013. He was unable to establish himself in KSC's first team during the 2013–14, and joined Arminia Bielefeld on a season-long loan in July 2014. For the 2016–17 season he went on loan to 3. Liga side Chemnitzer FC.

References

External links

1992 births
Living people
People from Rathenow
German footballers
Footballers from Brandenburg
Association football wingers
2. Bundesliga players
3. Liga players
Regionalliga players
Hallescher FC players
Karlsruher SC players
Arminia Bielefeld players
Chemnitzer FC players
Würzburger Kickers players
BSG Chemie Leipzig (1997) players